Cecily Polson, Australian actor
John Polson (born 1965), Australian actor
Nicholas Polson (born 1963), British statistician
Shannon Huffman Polson, American soldier and writer
Thomas Andrew Polson (1865–1946), Anglo-Irish writer and politician
William Polson (1875–1960), New Zealand politician

English-language surnames
Surnames from given names